Raymond O'Donnell (born 22 June 1978) is an Australian professional darts player who plays in Professional Darts Corporation events.

O'Donnell qualified for the 2018 Melbourne Darts Masters, where he would lose 6–4 to Raymond van Barneveld.

In 2017, he won the Murray Bridge Grand Prix, defeating Justin Thompson 8–6 in the final.

References

External links

1978 births
Living people
Australian darts players
Professional Darts Corporation associate players
People from Broken Hill, New South Wales
Sportsmen from New South Wales